Cryphia amasina is a moth of the family Noctuidae. It is found from Near East and Middle East to Turkmenistan and the Arabian Peninsula. In the Levant there are fragmented populations in Lebanon, Jordan and Israel.

Adults are on wing from July to October. There is one generation per year.

The larvae probably feed on lichen.

External links
The Acronictinae, Bryophilinae, Hypenodinae and Hypeninae of Israel

Cryphia
Moths of the Middle East
Moths described in 1931